{{Infobox school
 | name                    = Pretoria Boys High School
 | native_name             = 
 | latin_name              = 
 | logo                    = 
 | seal_image              = Pretoria Boys High School coat of arms.jpeg
 | image                   = 
 | image_size              = 350px
 | alt                     = 
 | caption                 = Badge of Pretoria Boys High School
 | motto                   = 
 | motto_translation       = "Through courage and labour"
 | location                = 
 | streetaddress           = 251 Roper Street, Brooklyn
 | region                  = 
 | city                    = Pretoria
 | province                = Gauteng
 | postcode                = 
 | postalcode              = 
 | zipcode                 = 0028
 | country                 = South Africa
 | coordinates             = 
 | pushpin_map             = 
 | schooltype              = All-boys public school
 | established             = 
 | founder                 = Alfred Milner, 1st Viscount Milner
 | sister_school           = Pretoria High School for Girls
 | headmaster              = Francois 
Pienaar
 | head                    = John Illsley
 | head_label              = Second master
 | chaplain                = 
 | staff                   = 100 full-time
 | grades                  = Forms I-V(grades 8–12)
 | gender                  = Male
 | lower_age               = 13
 | upper_age               = 18
 | age range               = 
 | students                = 1,500
 | language                = English
 | schedule                =  07:30 - 14:15
 | hours_in_day            = 6 h 45 min | classrooms              = 
 | campuses                = 2
 | campus                  = Main CampusPollock Campus
 | campus size             = 
 | area                    = 
 | campus type             = Urban
 | houses                  = Boarding houses: Rissik House Solomon House School houseDayboy houses: Abernethy House Arcadia House Armstrong House Hofmeyr House Matheson House Sunnyside House Town House | colours                 =  Red Green  
 White
 | slogan                  = 
 | song                    = 'Tis Here We Learn To Live'
 | fightsong               = 
 | athletics               = 
 | conference              = 
 | mascot                  = 
 | mascot image            = 
 | nickname                = Boys High | team_name               = Rugby 1st XV - "Candies", Hockey 1st XI - "Red Socks", Water Polo 1st VII  - "Chipmunks", Soccer 1st XI - "Stripes", Cricket 1st XI - "White Caps"
 | rivals                  = 
 | accreditation           =  Gauteng Department of Education | ranking                 = 
 | national_ranking        = 
 | testname                = 
 | testaverage             = 
 | bar pass rate           = 
 | roll                    = 
 | decile                  = 
 | publication             = 
 | newspaper               = The PhobianThe Boys Highlights
 | yearbook                = The Pretorian
 | products                = 
 | endowment               = 
 | budget                  = 
 | fees                    = R88,000 (boarding)  R63,800 (tuiton)
 | tuition                 = 
 | revenue                 = 
 | communities             = 
 | feeders                 = 
 | graduates               = 
 | affiliations            = 
 | nobel_laureates         = 
 | information             = 
 | website                 = 
 | footnotes               = 
 | picture                 = 
 | picture_caption         = Main school building (1909).
 | picture2                = 
 | picture_caption2        = 
}}

Pretoria Boys High School (Colloquially known as   Boys High  ) is a semi-private, tuition charging, English medium high school for boys situated in the suburb of Brooklyn in Pretoria in the Gauteng province of South Africa, founded in 1901 by Alfred Milner, 1st Viscount Milner. 

The school enrols over 1,500 pupils, including 300 boarders, from South Africa and beyond, managed by about 100 full-time staff.

Its neoclassical red-brick style main school buildings date from 1909, maintaining provincial heritage site status. A new media centre, library and music centre was completed in 2016. The school grounds also include a second campus, 'Pollock Campus', as well as sporting and recreational facilities. Three boarding houses are located on the school grounds: Rissik House and Solomon House are part of the original school complex completed in 1909, while School House was built later.

Its sister school is Pretoria High School for Girls, founded in 1902.

 History 

The antecedent of the current school is the historic Staats Model School, built 1896-1897 by the government of the Zuid-Afrikaansche Republiek (later Transvaal) in central Pretoria. Alfred Fernández Harington was appointed English master on 1 October 1895. The school was not in operation for very long owing to the outbreak of the Second Boer War in 1899. At the time, the building served as a prison, where notably Winston Churchill was briefly imprisoned.

The school was part of the whites-only education system, until the abolition of apartheid.

 Pretoria High School (19011903) 

With Pretoria under British control, it became apparent to Lord Milner, the Colonial Secretary at the time, that the educational facilities in the city needed attention as there was no secondary school for English-speaking pupils. The Staats Model School was duly refurbished. It was renamed Pretoria High School and became the first of the so-called Milner schools in the Transvaal, opening on 3 June 1901 with Charles Hope - who also founded Potchefstroom Boys High - as headmaster.  Initial enrolment was 32 pupils, both boys and girls, which increased to 132 by August of that year. Hope left 15 months later, along with the girls, who were finally accommodated into the old building of the former Transvaal Republic's Staatsmeischjeskool (State Girls' School), which was renamed Pretoria High School for Girls.

 Pretoria College (19031909) 

Under the new headmaster, Harold Atkinson, enrolment increased to 100 boys by 1903. The name of the school was also changed to Pretoria College. Atkinson left at the end of 1905 and was succeeded by J F Acheson who stayed with the school until it moved from Skinner Street to its current site in 1909. Formal devolution between primary and high school pupils only occurred in 1905.

 The new buildings and bilingualism (1910-1920) 

Milner's intention was to create a stable educational infrastructure in the new colony's capital and duly set aside  of ground to the south-east of central Pretoria for the construction of new academic institutions. The southernmost , which included the Waterkloof Kop (English: Waterkloof Hill), was chosen as the new site for Pretoria Boys High School. The architect, Patrick Eagle, met the challenge by designing an edifice rivalling its larger contemporary, Sir Herbert Baker's Union Buildings. Eagle chose to site the main buildings on the ridge of the hill giving the school its well-known dramatic setting.

The new school buildings were officially opened in 1909 by Jan Smuts, then colonial secretary of the Transvaal. The main building of the school, sited on Waterkloof Hill, is at present close to University of Pretoria, sitting opposite to the distant Union Buildings on Meintjieskop.

One year later, the four colonies of the Transvaal, Orange River Colony, Natal and the Cape formed the Union of South Africa. Keen to forge unity between English and Dutch (Afrikaner) South Africans, Smuts' influence was evident when, on 6 April 1910, the school absorbed 100 boys and staff from the Dutch-medium Eendracht High School to form a dual-medium high school. The combined school was now named Pretoria High School for Boys - Pretoria Hogere school voor Jongens. Smuts would later send his own sons to the school.

 Devolution and re-establishment (1920) 

The dual-medium institution would last ten years. By 1920, the divide between English and Afrikaans speakers had become apparent nationwide; this was reflected in the need for a separate Afrikaans high school in Pretoria. Consequently, the Afrikaanse Hoër Seunskool was formed immediately south of its parent, becoming the first Afrikaans-medium high school in the country, several years before Afrikaans attained official recognition as a language (and not a semi-creole of Dutch). The two schools enjoy close ties to this day, especially in  rivalry in sporting events. PBHS would now be left in its present form, known as Pretoria Boys High School, an English-medium public school.

 Headmasters since 1909 

 William Hofmeyr (19091935)
 Daniel Matheson (19361949)
 Noel Pollock (19501955)
 Desmond Abernethy (19561973)
 Malcolm Armstrong (19741989)
 William E. Schroder (19902009)
 Anthony Reeler (2010-June 2020)
 Gregary Hassenkamp (July 2020-)

 School 

 Heraldry 

According to Illsley, each component of the badge has a special meaning relating to the history and spirit of the school. The shield component of the badge is divided into four quadrants, with the book representing learning, the tools the wealth of the Transvaal through gold mining, the tree growth and the ox wagon the Transvaal. The background colours of the four quadrants were the colours of the first four houses when given permanent names, i.e. Town red, Solomon gold, Sunnyside black and Rissik green.

 The school songs 

The official school song, Tis Here We Learn To Live, was written in the 1930s by two Old Boys. The composer of the music, George Findlay, was a prominent Pretoria dermatologist. However, the school later adopted Forty Years On, originally the school song of Harrow School in London. It is this song that is sung at all school valedictions. The official school song was relegated to obscurity until it was revived as the school's rugby anthem.

 Culture and activities 

 Cultural activities 

Cultural activities include a well-established musical tradition, as well as a plethora of clubs and societies. These include photography, fantasy and historical war games, aeronautical, film, wildlife, drama, debating, chess, public speaking, creative writing and science clubs. The school newspaper "Boys Highlights" is published and distributed each term.

The school's Music Centre is regarded as one of the best in the country. The following ensembles frequently perform at school functions and external events:

Symphony orchestra 
Big band 
Dixie band
String quartet 
Brass choir
Clarinet ensemble
Saxophone ensemble
The Salon Boys
"Boere Orkes"
Pipe band 
Choir 
Vocal ensemble also known as the Harmonics

 Athletics and leisure 

Sporting facilities include soccer, rugby union, cricket, Olympic standard athletics grounds, tennis, squash and basketball courts, a gymnasium, hockey fields, two swimming pools including one for waterpolo, an AstroTurf and a rock-climbing wall. There is also a man-made pine forest, an old shooting range which has been converted for the purpose of archery, an amphitheatre and an artificial lake, Loch Armstrong. The grounds form a protected bird sanctuary and are home to several different species of birds, fish, amphibians and reptiles.

Sports
The sports that are played at the school are: 
 Archery 
 Athletics
 Basketball
 Chess
 Cricket
 Cross country
 Cycling
 Climbing
 Fencing
 Golf
 Hockey
 Mountain biking 
 Rowing 
 Rugby
 Rugby sevens 
 Football (soccer)  
 Squash
 Swimming
 Table tennis
 Tennis
 Water polo

 School buildings 

The new school buildings were officially opened in 1909 by Jan Smuts, then colonial secretary of the Transvaal. The main building of the school, sited on Waterkloof Hill, is at present close to University of Pretoria, sitting opposite to the distant Union Buildings on Meintjieskop.

 Houses 

Pretoria Boys High School is made up of ten constituent houses, each with its own culture and identity. House assemblies are held weekly, and house prefects are appointed annually. Annual inter-house sports meetings take place in which every pupil is encouraged to participate. The inter-house swim meet (gala) is the most popular and well-attended of sport meetings.

 Boarding houses 

 Solomon
 Rissik
 School

 Day-boy houses 

 Abernethy
 Arcadia
 Armstrong
 Hofmeyr
 Matheson
 Sunnyside
 Town

 The Old Boys Association 

Pretoria Boys High School has a network of Old Boys, forming one of the largest alumni organisations in South Africa. Pretoria Boys High School Old Boys Association publishes an annual journal and review, The Phobian, which is distributed to Old Boys'' across the globe. Members of the association meet annually at the school for the annual dinner, and regular reunions of each matriculating group are organised 10, 20, 30 and 40 years on, echoing the refrain of the school song, Forty Years On.

Notable alumni 

The school has produced two Nobel Prize laureates, eighteen Rhodes scholars, eight Supreme Court judges, an archbishop, two English Premier League football players, seven national cricketers and four Springbok rugby players

Notes and references

External links 

Old Boys website

Boys' schools in South Africa
Schools in Pretoria
Boarding schools in South Africa
Educational institutions established in 1901
History of Pretoria
1901 establishments in the South African Republic